Olimpia Fulvia Morata (1526 – 26 October 1555) was an Italian classical scholar.

Biography
She was born in Ferrara to Fulvio Pellegrino Morato and a certain Lucrezia Gozi.

Her father, who had been tutor to the young princes of the ducal house of Este, was on intimate terms with the most learned men of Italy, and the daughter grew up in an atmosphere of classical learning. At the age of twelve she was able to converse fluently in Greek and Latin.

About this time, she was summoned to the palace as companion and instructor of the younger but equally gifted Anna d'Este, daughter of Renata, duchess of Ferrara. Many people with literary fame or Protestant leanings, like John Calvin, Vittoria Colonna and Clément Marot visited the court of the duchess. In her teens Olympia lectured on Cicero and Calvin's works.

In 1546, she left court to take care of her ailing father and, after his death, she took care of the education of her brothers and sisters. Olympia's father died a convert to Protestantism, and Olympia embraced the doctrines of Luther and Calvin. When she returned to court, Anna d'Este's marriage to Francis, Duke of Guise left Olympia isolated. She spent her time studying philosophy and corresponded with Gasparo Sardi, who dedicated his De Triplici Philosophia to her.

About the end of 1550, she married a young student of medicine and philosophy, Andreas Grundler of Schweinfurt in Bavaria. In 1554 she accompanied Grundler to his place of birth, where he had been appointed physician to the garrison of Spanish troops. In 1553 the margrave Albert of Brandenburg on one of his plundering expeditions took possession of Schweinfurt, and was in turn besieged by the Protestants. At length Albert evacuated the place, and Olympia and her husband made their escape. In the course of these events many of her writings were lost.

They finally succeeded in reaching Heidelberg in 1554 where a medical lectureship had been obtained for Grundler through the influence of the Erbach family, by whom they had been hospitably entertained during their flight.

In 1558, after her death, a major collection of some of her Greek letters and Latin dialogues was published in Basel, a labour which she entrusted to her friend and correspondent Caelius Secundus Curio.

References

Sources
 

1526 births
1555 deaths
16th-century Italian women writers
Writers from Ferrara
Italian classical scholars
Women classical scholars
Modern Greek-language writers
16th-century Latin-language writers
Latin-language writers from Italy
Italian Renaissance humanists
Italian Protestants